João Vário (June 7, 1937 in Mindelo on São Vicente Island, Cape Verde – August 7, 2007 in Mindelo on  Island, Cape Verde) was a Cape Verdean writer, neurosurgeon, scientist and professor.  The name was a pseudonym of João Manuel Varela. Other aliases included Timóteo Tio Tiofe and G. T. Didial.

He studied medicine in the universities of Coimbra and Lisbon.  He earned a doctorate from the University of Antwerp in Belgium. He was a researcher and professor of neuropathology and neurobiology.  He returned to his native Mindelo where he lived until his death

He also wrote several poems.  He influenced writers such as Saint-John Perse, T. S. Eliot, Ezra Pound and Aimé Césaire.

Works
Exemplos 1-9 (Examples 1-9), volume that included General Example (Exemplo Geral), Relative Example (Exemplo Relativo), Dubious Example (Exemplo Dúbio) and Propriate Example (Exemplo Próprio)
Cadernos de Notcha, under the pseudonym Timóteo Tio Tiofe
Contos da Macaronésia (Tales From Macaronesia)
The State Impenitene On Fragility (O Estado impenitente da Fragilidade) under the pseudonym G. T. Didial

References

Further reading

Serrano, Luís. «João Vário, Esse Grande Escritor Cabo-Verdiano». Aveiro: 2007, in O Portal das Memórias de África e do Oriente.

External links
João Vário a great Cape Verdean writer (Portuguese)
Corsino Fortes and Osvaldo Osório on João Vário (Portuguese)
Para exemplo (coevo) de João Vário, por António Jacinto Pascoal
Baroque Example: A Poetic Paradigm from João Vário, by Rui Guilherme Gabriel 
Exit from the Divided Paradigm, a Part of the Letter from João Vário, by Silvina Rodrigues Lopes 

1937 births
2007 deaths
Cape Verdean male writers
Cape Verdean academics
People from Mindelo
Writers from São Vicente, Cape Verde